The mazhar is a tambourine used in Arabic music.

Mazhar ( Maẓhar), an Arabic male given name meaning "appearance", may refer to:

Given name
 Azrinaz Mazhar Hakim (born 1979), third wife of Sultan Hassanal Bolkiah of Brunei
 Mazhar Abbas (born 1958), Pakistani journalist
 Mazhar Alam Miankhel (born 1957), Justice of the Supreme Court of Pakistan
 Mazhar Alanson (born 1950), Turkish actor and pop musician
 Mazhar Ali Khan (disambiguation)
 Mazhar Ali Khan (Journalist) (?– ), Pakistani left-wing journalist
 Mazhar Ali Khan (painter) – 19th century artist from Delhi
 Mazhar Ali Khan (Singer) (? ), Hindustani classical vocalist of the Patiala Gharana
 Mazhar Hussain (born 1967), Pakistani cricketer
 Mazhar Kaleem (born 1942), Pakistani novelist
 Mazhar Khaleghi (born 1939), Kurdish singer
 Mazhar Khan (cricketer) (born 1964), Pakistani cricketer who played for Oman
 Mazhar Khan (actor, born 1905) (1905–1950), Indian actor, producer, and director
 Mazhar Khan (actor, born 1955) (1955–1998), Bollywood actor and director
 Mazhar Krasniqi (born 1931), Muslim community leader in New Zealand
 Mazhar Mahmood Qurashi (1925–2011), Pakistani physicist
 Mazhar Majeed (born 1975), British sporting agent and bookmaker
 Mazhar Müfit Kansu (1873–1948), Turkish civil servant and politician
 Mazhar Munir (? ), television and film actor
 Mirza Mazhar Jan-e-Janaan (1699-?), Urdu poet
 Mazhar Zaidi, British Pakistani film producer and journalist

Surname
 Ahmed Mazhar (1917–2002), Egyptian actor
 Sanaa Mazhar (1932–2018), Egyptian actress

See also
 Mazar (disambiguation)
 Mazaher